Zero Branco is a comune (municipality) in the Province of Treviso in the Italian region Veneto, located about  northwest of Venice and about  southwest of Treviso.

Geography
Zero Branco borders the following municipalities: Mogliano Veneto, Morgano, Piombino Dese, Preganziol, Quinto di Treviso, Scorzè, Trebaseleghe and Treviso.

People
Gaetano Cozzi (1922–2001), historian
Simone Favaro (1988–*), rugby union player

References

External links

 Official website 

Cities and towns in Veneto